Thomas Fisher may refer to:

Thomas Fisher (MP) (died 1577), English politician
Thomas Fisher (died 1613), MP for Taunton 
Thomas Fisher (antiquary) (1772–1836), English antiquary
Thomas Fisher (Upper Canada) (1792–1874), English-Canadian road builder, land developer, Squire, and Etobicoke Township pioneer 
Thomas Henry (illustrator) (Thomas Henry Fisher, 1879–1962), English illustrator
Thomas Cathrew Fisher (1871–1929), Anglican colonial bishop
Thomas L. Fisher, special effects artist of Titanic

See also
Tom Fisher (disambiguation)
Thomas Fischer (disambiguation)